"Ugly" is a song by American singer-songwriter Jon Bon Jovi that was the final single released from his second solo album, Destination Anywhere (1997).

Promotion
“Ugly" was released only in German-speaking Europe on April 6, 1998, reaching number 39 in Austria, number 41 in Switzerland, and number 75 in Germany. The song features a music video that was released on the DVD Destination Anywhere: The Film.

Track listing
German CD single
 "Ugly" (radio edit) – 3:11
 "Jersey Girl" (live) – 4:10
 "Billy Get Your Guns" (live) – 5:15
 "Ugly" (LP version) – 3:31

Credits and personnel
Credits are lifted from the Destination Anywhere album booklet.

Recording
 Written in Philadelphia, November 1996
 Recorded and produced at Studio 4 (Philadelphia), Gentlemen's Club (Miami Beach, Florida), Sanctuary Studios (New Jersey), Chapel Studios (Los Angeles), and Ding Bat Sound
 Mixed at Quad Studios (New York City)
 Mastered at Sterling Sound (New York City)

Personnel

 Jon Bon Jovi – writing, vocals, acoustic guitar, harmonica
 Eric Bazilian – writing, electric guitar, production
 Hugh McDonald – bass
 Rob Hyman – Wurlitzer piano
 Kenny Aronoff – drums
 Desmond Child – tuba, production
 Charles Dye – additional recording
 Andy Roshberg – additional recording
 Cage Gondar – additional recording

 J. C. Ulloa – additional recording
 Obie O'Brien – mixing, engineering
 Ann Mincieli – mixing assistant
 Mike Rew – mixing assistant
 Robert Valdez – assistant engineering
 Mike Malak – assistant engineering
 Lee Manning – assistant engineering
 George Marino – mastering

Charts

References

1996 songs
1998 singles
Jon Bon Jovi songs
Mercury Records singles
Music videos directed by Mark Pellington
Song recordings produced by Desmond Child
Songs written by Eric Bazilian
Songs written by Jon Bon Jovi